1555 papal conclave may refer to:

 April 1555 papal conclave, which elected Marcellus II to succeed Julius III
 May 1555 papal conclave, which elected Paul IV to succeed Marcellus II